Love Lies is a studio album by American country artist Janie Fricke. It was released in October 1983 via Columbia Records and contained ten tracks. The project was the eighth studio album of Fricke's music career and the second highest-charting album of her career. Three singles were spawned from the project: "Tell Me a Lie", "Let's Stop Talkin' About It" and "If the Fall Don't Get You". The first two singles from the disc reached number one on the North American country charts.

Background and content
Signed to Columbia Records in 1977, Janie Fricke had her breakthrough in 1981 when she began recording ballads. In 1982, she transitioned into a country-pop uptempo style with the album It Ain't Easy Her follow-up record called Love Lies would be crafted in a similar fashion to her 1982 LP. For the project, Fricke collaborated for the second time with producer Bob Montgomery. The album was recorded in July 1983 at the Soundshop Studio, located in Franklin, Tennessee. 

Love Lies was a collection of ten tracks. Included was a cover of Sami Jo's "Tell Me a Lie", which also appeared on It Ain't Easy. The title track was originally recorded by Cristy Lane for her 1978 album of the same name. The remainder of the record was a collection of up-tempo tracks ("If the Fall Don't Get You" and "Where's the Fire") and ballads ("Lonely People" and "How Do You Fall Out of Love").

Release, reception and singles

Love Lies was first released in October 1983 on Columbia Records. The disc was Fricke's eighth studio album. It was originally distributed as a vinyl LP and a cassette. It later decades, it was reissued to digital platforms including Apple Music. Love Lies was Fricke's fourth album to make the American Billboard country albums chart. It spent 52 weeks on the chart before peaking at number ten in April 1984. It was her second highest-charting album in her career, only second to 1986's Black and White. In later years, Love Lies received three out of five stars from AllMusic.

Love Lies spawned three singles between 1983 and 1984. Although originally released on Fricke's It Ain't Easy LP, "Tell Me a Lie" was officially released as a single in September 1983 in order to promote Love Lies. The single spent one week at the number one spot on Billboard Hot Country Songs chart in December 1983. In January 1984, "Let's Stop Talkin' About It" was released as the disc's second single. It also spent one week at the top of country songs chart, reaching the position in March 1984. In April 1984, "If the Fall Don't Get You" was spawned as the album's final single release. Later that summer, the song reached number eight on the Billboard country list. Additionally, both "Tell Me a Lie" and "Let's Stop Talkin' About It" would reach the number one spot on Canada's RPM country chart. "If the Fall Don't Get You" would climb to number six as well.

Track listings

Original versions

Digital version

Personnel
All credits are adapted from the liner notes of Love Lies.

Musical personnel
 Janie Fricke – lead and backing vocals
 Dan Huff – guitar
 Kenny Mims – electric guitar
 The Nashville String Machine – strings
 Ron Oates – keyboards
 James Stroud – drums
 William C. Warren – backing vocals
 Tony Wiggins – backing vocals
 Benny Wilson – backing vocals
 Bob Wray – bass

Technical personnel
 Bob Montgomery – producer

Charts

Release history

References

1983 albums
Albums produced by Bob Montgomery (songwriter)
Columbia Records albums
Janie Fricke albums